Paul Guiragossian (1926 – November 20, 1993) was an Armenian Lebanese painter.

Biography
Born to Armenian parents, survivors of the Armenian genocide, Paul Guiragossian experienced the consequences of exile from a very tender age. Raised in boarding schools, he grew up away from his mother who had to work to make sure her two sons got an education.

In the early 1940s, Guiragossian and his family moved to Jaffa where he attended Studio Yarkon (1944 - 1945) to start improving his passion for painting. In 1947, the family had to move again and settled in Lebanon.

In the 1950s, Guiragossian started teaching art in several Armenian schools and worked as an illustrator. He later started his own business with his brother Antoine, painting cinema banners, posters and drawing illustrations for books. Soon after he was discovered for his art and introduced to his contemporaries after which he began exhibiting his works in Beirut and eventually all over the world.

In 1956, Guiragossian won the first prize in a painting competition, which landed him a scholarship by the Italian government to study at the Accademia di Belle Arti di Firenze (The Academy of Fine Arts of Florence). While in Florence, he had multiple exhibitions starting with a solo show in 1958 at the Galeria D'Arte Moderna "La Permanente".

In 1961, Guiragossian returned to Beirut. In 1962, Guiragossian was granted another scholarship, this time by the French Government, to study and paint in Paris at Les Atelier Des Maîtres De L'Ecole De Paris and by the end of that year he had a solo exhibition at the Galerie Mouffe.

By the mid 1960s Guiragossian had grown to become one of the most celebrated artists in Lebanon and eventually of the Arab world and even though war broke out in the early 1970s, his attachment to Lebanon grew bigger and his works became more colorful with messages of hope for his people.

In 1989, Guiragossian went to Paris to exhibit his works in La Salle Des Pas Perdus in UNESCO and lived in the city with part of his family until 1991. In that year, he had a solo exhibition at the Institut du Monde Arabe. This exhibition was extended and marked the first solo show at the IMA for any artist.

Guiragossian died on November 20, 1993, in Beirut. That morning after completing a magnificent oil painting, he revealed to his daughter that he finally achieved what he always wanted, merging the old and the new in one painting.

The family agreed to title the painting "L'Adieu" and it remains unsigned in the Guiragossian family collection. His work can be found in the National Gallery of Armenia.

Family
In 1952, Paul married Juliette Hindian, a young painter and a former student of his. Together they had six children. Their son Ara died soon after birth and Paul painted several paintings as a tribute to him. All the children have studied different forms of art but Emmanuel, Jean-Paul and Manuella continued their careers as artist painters, making a name of their own in the art world. In 2011, the family established The Paul Guiragossian Foundation to preserve and promote his legacy.

See also
List of Armenian artists

References

External links
 www.paulguiragossian.com
 Paul Guiragossian (Lebanese, 1926–1993)
 Paul Guiragossian: The Human Condition
 A Fresh Perspective on Paul Guiragossian in Beirut

People from Jerusalem
Palestinian people of Armenian descent
Lebanese painters
1926 births
1993 deaths